Interstate business routes are roads connecting a central or commercial district of a city or town with an Interstate bypass. These roads typically follow along local streets often along a former US route or state highway that had been replaced by an Interstate. Interstate business route reassurance markers are signed as either loops or spurs using a green shield shaped and numbered like the shield of the parent Interstate highway.

Along Interstate 10 (I-10), business routes are found in the four westernmost states through which I-10 passes: California, Arizona, New Mexico, and the far western region of Texas beyond the Pecos River. Although I-10 is a transcontinental highway, none of the states to the east along the Interstate have yet to designate I-10 business routes.

Some states regard Interstate business routes as fully integrated within their state highway system while other states consider them to be either local roads to be maintained by county or municipal authorities or a hybrid of state and local control.

Although the public may differentiate between different business routes by the number of the parent route and the location of the route, there is no uniform naming convention. Each state highway department internally uses its own designations to identify segments within its jurisdiction.

California
Interstate business routes in California are assigned by the California Department of Transportation (Caltrans), but are not maintained by Caltrans unless they overlay other routes of the state highway system. Local authorities may request route assignment from the Caltrans Transportation System Information Program, and all requests require approval of the executive committee of the American Association of State Highway and Transportation Officials (AASHTO).

Blythe business loop

Interstate 10 Business is a business loop of I-10 at Blythe in Riverside County. The route begins at I-10 exit 236 and goes to the north along Neighbours Boulevard. The route turns to the east along Hobsonway through town, then crosses underneath I-10 just before the Colorado River at the Arizona state line and emerges from the underpass as Riviera Drive where the route reconnects with I-10 at exit 243. The business loop has major intersections with US Route 95 (US 95) and California State Route 78 (SR 78).

The route was formerly designated as part of US 60/US 70 except along Neighbours Blvd. The eastern part of the route also conveyed US 95.

Major intersections

Arizona
The business loops within Arizona are maintained by the Arizona Department of Transportation (ADOT) and by municipal authorities. I-10 has five business loops within the state including one in La Paz County, the westernmost in Arizona through which I-10 passes, and four in Cochise County, the easternmost. ADOT identifies Interstate business loops as State Business Routes followed by the number of the parent Interstate. Therefore, all I-10 business loops in Arizona carry the unsigned designation of Arizona State Route 10 Business (or State Business Route 10). Individual loops along an Interstate are designated by adding parenthetical numbers that increase eastward and northward. Gaps in numbering represent removal of former routes or potential expansion. Many of the business loops are sections of highways which preceded I-10, such as US 60, US 70, US 80 and Arizona State Route 86 (SR 86).

Quartzsite business loop

State Business Route 10 (1) (also known as SR 10 Bus.) is a business loop of I-10 at Quartzsite in La Paz County operated since 1991. The  route, which follows along the local streets Quartzsite Boulevard, Main Street, and Riggles Avenue, begins at exit 17 of I-10 and US 95 west of town and ends at exit 24 of I-10 east of town. Between its termini, the route has a major intersection with SR 95 where it ends a concurrency with US 95.

The route was originally designated along part of US 60 and US 70.

Major intersections

Phoenix business loop

State Business Route 10 (Phoenix) (also known as SR 10 Bus.) was a business loop of I-10 at Phoenix, in Maricopa County, decommissioned circa 1990. Prior to the completion of I-10 through Phoenix, this business loop connected the eastern and western segments of the Interstate on a route through Downtown Phoenix.

Prior to its decommissioning, the route began at I-10 exit 142 (27th Avenue), heading south before turning east at Van Buren Street. At the five-legged intersection with Grand Avenue and 7th Avenue, I-10 BL began a concurrency with US 60 and US 89. This concurrency ended as I-10 BL turned right at 44th Street, heading south again before terminating at I-10 exit 153 (48th Street).

The 44th Street leg of the Phoenix I-10 BL has since been replaced by part of the Hohokam Expressway (SR 143).

Major intersections
Major highway intersections as listed shortly before I-10 BL was decommissioned in 1990.

Tucson business loop

State Business Route 10 (2) (also known as SR 10 Bus.) was a business loop of I-10 at Tucson in Pima County operated between 1972 and 2001. The  route followed Tucson–Benson Highway through the south end of Tucson, starting at exit 262 in town and ended at exit 267 east of town. Between its termini, the route made a quick jog down Irvington Road near Tucson Boulevard to stay on Benson Highway and used a small section of Valencia Road at the end of Benson Highway to access exit 267.

The route was formerly designated as part of US 80 and SR 86. Maintenance of the route was transferred to the city of Tucson upon decommissioning.

Major intersections

Benson business loop

State Business Route 10 (3) (also known as SR 10 Bus.) is a business loop of I-10 at Benson in Cochise County operated since 1974. The  route follows along Benson's Fourth Street beginning at exit 303 of I-10 west of town and ends at exit 306 of I-10 east of town. Between its termini, the route has a major intersection with SR 80. The western part of the business loop from I-10 to SR 80 is signed as part of Historic US 80.

The route was originally designated along part of SR 86 while US 80 was conveyed over a portion of the present business route.

Major intersections

Benson business spur

State Route 10 Spur (also known as SR 10 Spur) was a business spur of I-10 at Benson in Cochise County operated from 1969 to 1999. The  route followed Ocotillo Road south from I-10 before ending at 4th Street (I-10 BL) west of downtown Benson.

Maintenance of the route was transferred to the city of Benson upon decommissioning.

Major intersections

Willcox business loop

State Business Route 10 (4) (also known as SR 10 Bus.) is a business loop of I-10 at Willcox in Cochise County operated since 1986. The  route, following along Willcox's Haskell Avenue, begins at exit 336 of I-10 west of town and ends at exit 344 of I-10 east of town. Between its termini, the route has a brief concurrency with SR 186.

The route was formerly designated as part of US 666 and SR 86.

Major intersections

Bowie business loop

State Business Route 10 (5) (also known as SR 10 Bus.) is a business loop of I-10 at Bowie in Cochise County operated since 1980. The  route along Sixth Street in Bowie begins at exit 362 of I-10 west of town and ends at exit 366 of I-10 east of town. Between its termini, the route has no major intersections.

The route was formerly designated as part of SR 86.

Major intersections

San Simon business loop

State Business Route 10 (6) (also known as SR 10 Bus.) is a business loop of I-10 at San Simon in Cochise County operated since 1961. The  route follows San Simon's Sixth Street beginning at exit 378 of I-10 west of town and ending at exit 382 of I-10 east of town. Between its termini, the route has no major intersections.

The route was formerly designated as part of SR 86.

Major intersections

New Mexico
All of the business loops within New Mexico are maintained by the New Mexico Department of Transportation (NMDOT). In New Mexico, Interstate business routes are named independently of their parent Interstate's designation with business loops of I-25 numbered between 10–19, those of I-10 between 20–29, and those of I-40 between 30–39. New Mexico business loop numbers ascend eastward and northward with gaps in numbering to allow for future designations. Within New Mexico, I-10 currently has business routes in Lordsburg and Deming.

Lordsburg business loop

Business Loop 21 is a business loop of Interstate 10 at Lordsburg in Hidalgo County. The  route, which follows the city's Motel Drive, begins at exit 20 of I-10 west of town and ends at exit 24 of I-10 and US 70 east of town. Between its termini, the route has major intersections with US 70 and New Mexico State Road 494 (NM 494).

The route was originally designated as part of US 80 while a portion of the business route also conveyed US 70.

Major intersections

Deming business loop

Business Loop 22 is a business loop of I-10 at Deming in Luna County. The  route begins at exit 81 of I-10 and US 70 west of town and follows Pine Street and Motel Drive to exit 85 of I-10, US 70, and US 180 east of town. Between its termini, the route has major intersections with US 180, NM 418, and NM 549.

The route was originally designated as part of US 70 and US 80 while a portion of the business route also conveyed US 180.

Major intersections

Texas
All of the business loops within Texas are maintained by the Texas Department of Transportation (TxDOT). I-10 has four business loops in the state, each located in the far western Trans-Pecos region. Along I-10, TxDOT identifies each business route as Business Interstate 10 followed by an alphabetic suffix. Along Texas Interstates, the alphabetic suffixes on business route names ascend eastward and northward. There are gaps in the alphabetic values to allow for future system expansion. The alphabetic naming suffixes are included as small letters on the bottom of reassurance shields.

Sierra Blanca business loop

Business Interstate 10-C or Bus. I-10-C is a business loop of I-10 at Sierra Blanca in Hudspeth County commissioned in 1991. The  route follows El Paso Street beginning at exit 105 on I-10 west of town and ending at exit 108 on I-10 east of town. The route has one major intersection with Ranch to Market Road 1111 (RM 1111) to Cornudas and Dell City.

The road was originally designated as part of US 80. After October 15, 1965, the road was designated Texas State Highway Loop 416, although it was signed as a business route of US 80. This became the present Business I-10 designation on June 21, 1990.

Major intersections

Van Horn business loop

Business Interstate 10-D or Bus. I-10-D is a business loop of I-10 at Van Horn in Culberson County commissioned in 1991. The  route, which follows along Ross Drive and Broadway Boulevard in Van Horn, begins at exit 138 on I-10 west of town and ends at exit 140B on I-10 east of town. The road has major intersections with US 90 and Texas State Highway 54 (SH 54).

The road was originally designated as part of US 80. On November 25, 1975, the road was designated Texas State Highway Loop 519, although it was signed as a business route of US 80.

Major intersections

Balmorhea business loop

Business Interstate 10-F or Bus. I-10-F is a business loop of I-10 at Balmorhea in Reeves County commissioned in 1992. The route begins at exit 206 on I-10 and Farm to Market Road 2903 (FM 2903, Fort Worth Street) north of town and ends at exit 209 on I-10 and SH 17 (Main Street) east of the small community of Brogado. The junction where the road merges with SH 17 is the only major intersection between the road's termini.

The portion of Bus. I-10-F concurrent with SH 17 was formerly part of US 290 with the remainder formerly a southern extension of FM 2903.

Major intersections

Fort Stockton business loop

Business Interstate 10-G or Bus. I-10-G is a business loop of I-10 at Fort Stockton in Pecos County commissioned in 1992. The route, following the city's Dickinson Boulevard, begins at exit 256 on I-10 and US 67 west of town and ends at exit 261 on I-10, US 67, and US 385 east of town. Between its termini, the route has major intersections with US 285, US 385, SH 18, and FM 1053.

Bus. I-10-G was formerly designated as part of US 290.

Major intersections

See also

References

External links
AARoads Interstate Guide – Interstate Business Route 10
California @ AARoads – Business Loop I-10
Arizona @ AARoads – Interstate 10
New Mexico @ AARoads – Interstate 10
Texas @ AARoads – Interstate 10
Riner, Steve, U.S. and Interstate Highways in New Mexico

10
Interstate 10
Transportation in Cochise County, Arizona
Transportation in La Paz County, Arizona
Roads in Riverside County, California
Transportation in Hidalgo County, New Mexico
Transportation in Luna County, New Mexico
Transportation in Culberson County, Texas
Transportation in Hudspeth County, Texas
Transportation in Pecos County, Texas
Transportation in Reeves County, Texas